Melvin Whitfield Carter III (born January 8, 1979) is an American politician who has served as mayor of Saint Paul, Minnesota, since 2018. Elected to his first term in 2017 and reelected in 2021, Carter is the 55th mayor of St. Paul and its first African American mayor.

Early life and education

Carter was born in St. Paul's Rondo Neighborhood. He is the son of Melvin Whitfield Carter Jr., a retired Saint Paul police officer, and Toni Carter, a Ramsey County commissioner. Carter is a fourth-generation Saint Paul resident. He participated in the University of Minnesota Talented Youth in Mathematics Program (UMTYMP) in junior high and high school, and graduated from Saint Paul Central High School.

Carter earned a bachelor's degree in business administration from Florida A&M University. During his time there, he became a brother of Alpha Phi Alpha fraternity. Carter earned a Master of Public Policy from the Humphrey School of Public Affairs of the University of Minnesota.

Career
Carter served as a Saint Paul City Council member from 2008 to 2013 and was a vice chair of the council.

He also served as founding board chair of the Saint Paul Promise Neighborhood, director of the Minnesota Office of Early Learning, and executive director of the Minnesota Children's Cabinet, advising former Governor Mark Dayton on early childhood policy. He also was an adjunct faculty member at University of Minnesota-Duluth, teaching graduate-level classes on campaigns and elections.

Mayor of St. Paul

During his tenure as mayor, Carter was instrumental in raising the city's minimum wage to $15 per hour. He also established the Office of Financial Empowerment. He launched CollegeBound Saint Paul, the city's college savings account program, and the People's Prosperity Pilot, a guaranteed income program that gives 150 families $500 per month for 18 months.

Carter also served on the steering committee of the Mayors National Climate Action Agenda, a consortium of American mayors advocating for the reduction of greenhouse gas emissions. In 2019, he reestablished the Affordable Housing Trust Fund. He managed revitalization efforts of the Saint Paul riverfront, and the conversion of the former Ford Motor Company's Twin Cities Assembly Plant ("Ford site") in Highland Park into a mixed-use housing and retail center. Carter eliminated the practice of collecting late fees at Saint Paul public libraries and spearheaded the Families First Housing Pilot program.

In June 2021, Carter was one of 11 U.S. mayors who formed Mayors Organized for Reparations and Equity (MORE), a coalition of municipal leaders dedicated to starting pilot reparations programs in their cities.

Personal life
Carter still resides in the Rondo neighborhood, where he was raised, along with his wife, Sakeena Futrell-Carter, and their children. He is a cousin of professional football player Kenjon Barner.

Elections

References

External links
 
 Official mayoral website
 

1979 births
21st-century American politicians
African-American mayors in Minnesota
African-American city council members in Minnesota
Living people
Mayors of Saint Paul, Minnesota
Minnesota Democrats
University of Minnesota Duluth faculty
21st-century African-American politicians
20th-century African-American people